To Kau Wan is a bay on the north shore of northeast Lantau Island, Hong Kong. Contaminated soil from Penny's Bay was transferred here for thermal desorption to separate the Volatile Organic Compounds (VOC) and Semi-Volatile Organic Compounds (SVOC) along with cement immobilization of metal contamination from Penny's Bay. The oily residue was transferred to the Chemical Waste Treatment Center (CWTC) in Tsing Yi for incineration (particularly for dioxins and dioxin-like compounds).

See also
 Tsing Chau Tsai Peninsula

Lantau Island
Tsuen Wan District
Bays of Hong Kong